This is a list of people from Cluj-Napoca, Romania.

Natives
Otto Adler (1929–), president of the Jewish Association of Romania
Alexandru Agache (1955–), operatic baritone 
Egon Balas (1922–2019), mathematician, professor at Carnegie Mellon University
Edith Balas (1929-), art historian, professor at Carnegie Mellon University
Oana Ban (1986-), Olympic gymnast and gold medalist (2004)
Dezső Bánffy (1843–1911), Prime Minister of Hungary (1895-1899).
Miklós Bánffy (1873–1950), nobleman, novelist, Foreign Minister of Hungary (1921–1922)
Stephen Bocskay (1557–1606), Calvinist nobleman, Prince of Transylvania (1605–1606).
Ádám Bodor (1936–), author
János Bolyai (1802–1860), mathematician
Ruxandra Cesereanu (1963–), poet, writer and literary critic
Matthias Corvinus (1443–1490), King of Hungary and Croatia (1458-1490).
Flaviu Cristian (1951–1999), Romanian-American computer scientist
Ferenc Dávid (ca. 1510–1579), preacher, founder of the Unitarian Church of Transylvania
Tissa David (1921-2012), animator
Péter Eckstein-Kovács (1956-), lawyer and politician
Agnes Esterhazy (1898-1956), film actress
Magda Frank (1914–2010), sculptor
Mihai Gavrilă (1929–), quantum physicist
Bela Gold (1915–2012), American academic 
Ionel Haiduc (1937–), chemist, President of the Romanian Academy (2006-2014)
Michael Halász (1938–), classical conductor
Gabriella and Monica Irimia (1982–), singers known as The Cheeky Girls
Emil Isac (1886-1954), poet, playwright and critic
Dezső Kalinovszky (1933 in Cluj–2009), Romanian writer
Béla Károlyi (1942-), gymnastics coach
Rudolf Kastner (1906-1957), Zionist activist, journalist and lawyer
Irina Lăzăreanu (1982–), model and folk singer
János Martonyi (1944-), politician, Foreign Minister of Hungary (1998-2002; 2010–2014)
Elena Moldovan Popoviciu (1924-2009), mathematician
Ibrahim Muteferrika (1674-1745), Ottoman diplomat, printer and historian
Ion Negoițescu (1921–1993), literary critic and memoirist
Adrian Papahagi (1976–), medievalist and politician
Sergiu P. Pașca (1982–), neuroscientist
Florin Piersic (1936-), theater and film actor
Sándor Reményik (1890–1941), poet
Rudolph von Ripper (1905–1960), artist and soldier
Daniela L. Rus (1963–), American computer scientist
Lívia Rusz (1930–), graphic artist
Heinrich Schönfeld (born 1900), Austrian football player
István Szamosközy (1570-1612), historian
László Tőkés (1952-), Calvinist bishop, 1989 revolutionary, politician
Sándor Végh (1912-1997), violinist and conductor
Abraham Wald (1902-1950), mathematician

Inhabitants

Endre Ady (1877-1919), poet
Ion Agârbiceanu (1882-1963), novelist
Bartolomeu Anania (1921-2011), Orthodox bishop
Lucian Blaga (1895-1961), poet and philosopher
Nicolae Bocșan (1947-2016), historian, rector of Babeș-Bolyai University (2004–2008)
Alexandru Borza (1887-1971), botanist, founder of the Cluj-Napoca Botanical Garden
Corneliu Coposu (1914-1995), founder of the Christian Democratic National Peasants' Party, anti-communist political prisoner
Doina Cornea (1929-), dissident
Constantin Daicoviciu (1898-1973), historian, rector of Babeș-Bolyai University (1956–1968)
Horia Demian (1942-1989), basketball player
Gheorghe Funar (1949-), mayor of Cluj-Napoca (1992-2004)
Onisifor Ghibu (1883-1972), teacher of pedagogy and politician
Yekusiel Yehudah Halberstam (1905-1994), Orthodox Jewish rabbi
Emil Hațieganu (1878-1959), politician and jurist
Iuliu Hațieganu (1885-1959), doctor, tuberculosis researcher
Iuliu Hossu (1885-1970), Greek-Catholic bishop, political prisoner
Antal Kagerbauer (1814-1872), architect
Olga Lengyel (1908-2001), Auschwitz prisoner, memoirist
Scott Long (1963-), lesbian, gay, bisexual, and transgender activist
Ioan Lupaș (1880-1967), historian, politician and Orthodox priest
Augustin Maior (1882-1963), physicist, educator and inventor
Iuliu Maniu (1873-1953), politician, three times Prime Minister of Romania (1928-1933)
Andrei Marga (1946-), political scientist and politician, rector of Babeș-Bolyai University (1993–2004, 2008–2012)
Dorinel Munteanu (1968-), football player and manager
Gheorghe Mureșan (1971-), basketball player
Ioan Gyuri Pascu (1961-2016), pop singer, actor and comedian
Emil Racoviță (1868-1947), biologist and explorer of Antarctica
Ion Rațiu (1917-2000), politician and exile activist
Raluca Ripan (1894-1972), chemist, rector of Babeș-Bolyai University (1951–1956)
Dumitru D. Roșca (1895-1980), philosopher and professor
Ioan Sabău (1968-), football player
Emil Simon (1936-2014), conductor and composer
Raoul Șorban (1912-2006), painter, writer and academic
Alexandru Vaida-Voevod (1872-1950), politician, Prime Minister of Romania (1919-1920)

References

 
Cluj-Napoca